is a 1969 Japanese yakuza film directed by Yasuo Furuhata. It is the second film in Gendai Yakuza, a series of yakuza films made in the late 1960s and 1970s.

Plot
The film centers around three brothers, who are all born into poverty and raised in a slum. The eldest son, Kōichi, becomes a powerful gang leader, the second son, Gorō, is a lone wolf fighting on his own terms, and the third son, Tōru, is alive but lacks a purpose to guide his life. The world of Japanese organized crime soon drags all three brothers into a horrific struggle of hatred and revenge.

Cast
 Bunta Sugawara as Katsumata Gorō
 Masakazu Tamura as Katsumata Tōru (Gorō's younger brother)
 Fumio Watanabe as Yamazaki
 Yoshie Mizutani as Misa
 Tadao Nakamuru as Kuroda
 Ai Sasaki as Reiko
 Nobuo Yana as Itō
 Ryō Ikebe as Katsumata Koichi (Gorō's elder brother)

See also
Gendai Yakuza: Hitokiri Yota, the sixth Gendai Yakuza film, which also featured Sugawara as the lead.

References

External links

Yakuza films
1960s crime films
Toei Company films
1960s Japanese films